Rock (known in some series as Rokuro Makube a.k.a. Rock Macbeth or ) is a recurrent major character in most of Osamu Tezuka's manga series, and he is an important part of Osamu Tezuka's Star System. As all of Tezuka's main characters he is seen repeatedly in different works but differs as the character with the most various and changing roles from both hero and antihero.

Appearance and Role
Rock (sometimes spelled Roc) mainly appears as a young man with shiny dark hair and blue eyes. His appearance stays relatively the same, with hair that retains its style across works, but that often changes colour. He first appeared in the manga  and later in the series 
, as a child detective. (His name and traits where then based on Sherlock Holmes). Developing later into a more villainous character, his name changed into Rock Macbeth (Makube) as both his character and backstory where based on the famous antagonist of the Tragedy of Macbeth. He is later seen wearing dark sunglasses which, together with his ability to be a master of disguise, became one of his main trademarks.

Appearing often as both a hero and antihero he is mainly portrayed as a strong, determined and charismatic leader whose both personality and beliefs stand as opposition to Tezuka's main protagonists Black Jack and Astro Boy.

Already during his early roles as a good character his approach and ideas where more dark and harsh than the optimistic views of his friends Kenichi, Astro Boy and Black Jack. But in Tezuka's original works (such as The Adventures of Rock and Phoenix) his solutions were also portrayed as the more realistic and effective ones, while Astro Boy's striving towards an idealistic approach could never give an ultimate solution to the main problem of all Tezuka's works: war between two races or types (mostly humans vs. robots, other creatures or ugly vs. the beautiful).

Character development
Rock appears as the most complex and round of all Tezuka's characters, undergoing major transformations and development through most of his works, while the other major other characters generally retained their original personalities and roles.

While most of other Tezuka child characters (such as Kenichi) stayed the same age, Rock grew up throughout the years and his character was reused for more mature "roles" in Tezuka's manga, where he gradually developed a darker personality.  Often cold and brutal, his character tends to be used as an antagonist, who later, in works such as Vampires, kidnapped and murdered people for the sake of achieving his goals. In this older form, Rock is often wearing a three-piece suit, a striped tie and dark sunglasses, the last of which became something of a trademark for him.  Rock's dark persona appeared for the first time in the uncompleted Vampire manga, which was the first time Rock went by the name "Makube Rokuro", based on MacBeth for Makube and Kuro ("black" in Japanese) for Rokuro (mixed with "Rock").

He is often presented as a considerably more complex antagonist than many of Tezuka's other villains (who are usually bad people simply because that's what they've always been and always will be), and his actions are sometimes explained by a rough past (in the manga Nextworld, Metropolis and the newest Astro Boy series, for example).

Rock often appears as either a heroic major or protagonist character, such as in Adventures of Rock and Princess Knight TV Series (as Prince Frank, Sapphire's love interest), or as an antagonist whose brutal means often have justified motives through the storyline (such as in Phoenix and other works). One of the very few instances in which he's been given a lighter and more comedic role was in 1985's Say Hello to Bookila, in which he was a hack writer investigating the truth behind a series of mysterious occurrences at a TV station.  He is also the hero in the 1980 film Marine Express where he is again cast in a romantic lead with Sapphire, throughout which he is usually seen without his trademark sunglasses.

Rock's role eventually developed from a sympathetic antihero to a notorious villain who will do almost anything for his personal causes (in Vampires and Alabaster). Through his evil role in the story Vampires he develops a further demonic nature in the manga Alabaster where he is seen as having no qualms about torturing, raping and killing to achieve his ends. Though in Alabaster his ambition develops to the point of narcissism he never becomes the most evil of Tezuka's characters (a role developed in the character of Yuki).

His role gradually transferred from an orphaned boy with bitter experiences (Nextworld manga), to a passionate leader or agent of ruthless means who still acts upon some causes and values (Phoenix), a spoiled rich man's son (in most works Duke Red is his father) with villainous tendencies, to a royal figure (in Buddha and Princess Knight). Such was his role as King Bimbisara who retains Makube Rock's ambitious and self-preserving nature but also appears in a positive light as the only character wise and clearsighted enough to immediately recognise Siddhartha's greatness and grants him his name Buddha - The Enlightened One.

In the adaptations after Tezuka's death Rock appears in works such as the 2001 Metropolis movie and the 2005 Black Jack: The Two Doctors of Darkness as a mixture of all of his roles. Setting off as an antagonist who ruthlessly strives to achieve his goal he is eventually pictured redeeming himself after dying for his fiancee Midori in Black Jack while he dies trying to save his father in Metropolis. This trait was never seen in Tezuka's works where he only repents and faces death bravely but never finds redemption by willingly sacrificing his life.

Prominent roles and appearances
Rock was most recently seen in the animated version of Tezuka's Metropolis (the manga for which he did not appear in) and in the recent Astro Boy series (as the secret identity of villain Deadcross). He also appeared in the 2005 Black Jack: Two Doctors of Darkness movie. A character named Rock (but of a different appearance and personality) also appeared in the 1980 animated Phoenix 2772.  In addition, Rock's character (sans sunglasses) was used to portray the young King Bimbisara in Tezuka's sprawling Buddha.

Rock has appeared in more than 60 different manga and animated works, in the live action Vampire TV series, and in the Astro Boy: Omega Factor video game.

"Rock Holmes" in Detective boy Rock Holmes - 1949
"Rock" in Nextworld - 1951
"Rock" in The Adventure of Rock - 1952
"Rock" in X-Point on the South Pacific - 1953
"Rovel" in Astro Boy /Führer ZZZ - 1954
"Kenta" in Astro Boy /Duel on the Alps - 1956
"Vassanio" in Merchant of Venice - 1959
"Mamoru Hoshino" in Captain Ken - 1960
"Rob" in Galaxy Boy Troop - 1963 (both as an animated character and a marionette)
"Makube Rock" in The Vampires - 1966-69
"Prince Frank" in Princess Knight TV series - 1967-1968
"Rock" in Phoenix "Future" - 1967
"Rock Holmes" in Alabaster - 1970
"King Bimbisara" in Buddha - 1972-1982
"Akudo" in Black Jack: Where is a Doctor! - 1973 (son of Duke Red)
"Rock" in Black Jack/Finger - 1974 (sealed - rewritten as "Print Proof" 1978)
"Dr. Ohedo" in Black Jack /Nadare the Deer - 1974
"Thomas Waterman" in The Story of Stone - 1975
"Satoru" in The Story of Bis Bis Bis Planet - 1975
"Baron Rockbelt" in Metamorphose /Woobbit - 1976 (appears as both human and werewolf)
"Rock" in Black Jack /The Last Train - 1978 (as the husband of the Black Queen)
"Rokku Homura" in Black Jack /Tenacious Black Jack - 1978
"Makube Rock" in Black Jack /Print Proof - 1978 (Black Jack's childhood friend)
"Rock" in Undersea Super Train: Marine Express - 1979 anime
"Rock" in Fumoon - 1980 anime
"Rock" in Phoenix 2772 - 1980 anime
"Rock" in Metropolis - 2001 anime (but not in the original manga)
"Makube Rock" in Black Jack online Flash animation episode 9 - 2001/2 (retelling of Print Proof)
"Rock" in Astro Boy TV Series episodes 34 - 35 - 2003 anime
"Rock/Lord Deadcross" in Astro Boy GBA game "Omega Factor" - 2004 two different manifestations – human and robot (President Rag)
"Akudo" in Black Jack "Four Miracles of Life" animated special 1 - 2004
"Dr. Daigo Oeda" in Black Jack TV episode 24, "Nadare the Deer" - 2004-6
"Rock" in Phoenix TV, episodes 12-13 - 2005
"Rock" in Black Jack Movie "Two Dark Doctors" - 2005
"Rock" in Black Jack: Phoenix Version game for Nintendo DS - 2006
"Leader Ratoh/Ratom" in Ravex in Tezuka World - 2009 (appears as both a human and a robot fusion with Astro Boy)

See also
List of Osamu Tezuka anime
List of Osamu Tezuka manga

References

External links
Rock Homes at TezukaOsamu@World

Astro Boy
Fictional detectives
Osamu Tezuka characters
Male characters in anime and manga